Eurytus, Eurytos (Ancient Greek: Εὔρυτος) or Erytus (Ἔρυτος) is the name of several characters in Greek mythology, and of at least one historical figure.

Mythological
Eurytus, one of the Giants, sons of Gaia, killed by Dionysus during the Gigantomachy, the battle of the Giants versus the Olympian gods.
Eurytus, a chieftain at the court of king Cepheus, and was killed by Perseus during the battle between the latter and Phineus.
Eurytus, king of Caria and the father of Eidothea, who was one of the possible spouses of Miletus.
Eurytus, a centaur present at the wedding of Pirithous and Hippodamia, and the one that caused the conflict between the Lapiths and the Centaurs by trying to carry the bride off. The most violent of the centaurs involved in the battle with the Lapiths, he was killed by Theseus.
Eurytus, king of Oechalia, Thessaly, and father of Iole and Iphitus.
Eurytus, father of Cleobule, mother by Tenthredon of Prothous, leader of the Magnesians during the Trojan War.
Eurytus, son of Hippocoön was killed, along with his brothers, by Heracles.
Eurytus or Erytus, son of Hermes and Antianeira or Laothoe, and brother of Echion. He was one of the Argonauts, and also hunted the Calydonian Boar.
Eurytus, son of Molione, by either Poseidon or Actor.
Eurytus, an Elean prince as one of the children of King Augeas.
Eurytus, the Greek leader of the Epeans (from Elis) and Taphians during the Trojan War, and an ally of Elephenor. He was killed by Telephus's son Eurypylus.
Eurytus, father of Clonus. His son was known for having made the belt of Pallas.
Eurytus, an alternate name for Eurypylus of Cyrene.

Historical
Eurytus, a Spartan warrior, one of the Three Hundred sent to face the Persians at the Battle of Thermopylae in 480 BC.
Eurytus a Pythagorean philosopher (fl. 400 BC).

Notes

References 
 Antoninus Liberalis, The Metamorphoses of Antoninus Liberalis translated by Francis Celoria (Routledge 1992). Online version at the Topos Text Project.
 Apollodorus, The Library with an English Translation by Sir James George Frazer, F.B.A., F.R.S. in 2 Volumes, Cambridge, MA, Harvard University Press; London, William Heinemann Ltd. 1921. ISBN 0-674-99135-4. Online version at the Perseus Digital Library. Greek text available from the same website.
Apollonius Rhodius, Argonautica translated by Robert Cooper Seaton (1853-1915), R. C. Loeb Classical Library Volume 001. London, William Heinemann Ltd, 1912. Online version at the Topos Text Project.
 Apollonius Rhodius, Argonautica. George W. Mooney. London. Longmans, Green. 1912. Greek text available at the Perseus Digital Library.
 Diodorus Siculus, The Library of History translated by Charles Henry Oldfather. Twelve volumes. Loeb Classical Library. Cambridge, Massachusetts: Harvard University Press; London: William Heinemann, Ltd. 1989. Vol. 3. Books 4.59–8. Online version at Bill Thayer's Web Site
Diodorus Siculus, Bibliotheca Historica. Vol 1-2. Immanel Bekker. Ludwig Dindorf. Friedrich Vogel. in aedibus B. G. Teubneri. Leipzig. 1888–1890. Greek text available at the Perseus Digital Library.
Euripides, The Plays of Euripides, translated by E. P. Coleridge. Volume II. London. George Bell and Sons. 1891. Online version at the Perseus Digital Library.
 Euripides, Euripidis Fabulae. vol. 3. Gilbert Murray. Oxford. Clarendon Press, Oxford. 1913. Greek text available at the Perseus Digital Library.
 Gaius Julius Hyginus, Fabulae from The Myths of Hyginus translated and edited by Mary Grant. University of Kansas Publications in Humanistic Studies. Online version at the Topos Text Project.
 March, J., Cassell's Dictionary Of Classical Mythology, London, 1999. 
 Pausanias, Description of Greece with an English Translation by W.H.S. Jones, Litt.D., and H.A. Ormerod, M.A., in 4 Volumes. Cambridge, MA, Harvard University Press; London, William Heinemann Ltd. 1918. . Online version at the Perseus Digital Library
Pausanias, Graeciae Descriptio. 3 vols. Leipzig, Teubner. 1903.  Greek text available at the Perseus Digital Library.
Publius Ovidius Naso, Metamorphoses translated by Brookes More (1859-1942). Boston, Cornhill Publishing Co. 1922. Online version at the Perseus Digital Library.
 Publius Ovidius Naso, Metamorphoses. Hugo Magnus. Gotha (Germany). Friedr. Andr. Perthes. 1892. Latin text available at the Perseus Digital Library.
 Publius Vergilius Maro, Aeneid. Theodore C. Williams. trans. Boston. Houghton Mifflin Co. 1910. Online version at the Perseus Digital Library.
 Publius Vergilius Maro, Bucolics, Aeneid, and Georgics. J. B. Greenough. Boston. Ginn & Co. 1900. Latin text available at the Perseus Digital Library.
 Quintus Smyrnaeus, The Fall of Troy translated by Way. A. S. Loeb Classical Library Volume 19. London: William Heinemann, 1913. Online version at theio.com
 Quintus Smyrnaeus, The Fall of Troy. Arthur S. Way. London: William Heinemann; New York: G.P. Putnam's Sons. 1913. Greek text available at the Perseus Digital Library.
Tzetzes, John, Allegories of the Iliad translated by Goldwyn, Adam J. and Kokkini, Dimitra. Dumbarton Oaks Medieval Library, Harvard University Press, 2015. 

Gigantes
Centaurs
Argonauts
Achaean Leaders
Kings in Greek mythology
Metamorphoses characters
Characters in the Argonautica
Elean characters in Greek mythology
Thessalian mythology